Below is a list of short films or animated cartoons that pertain to World War II, or the years leading up to it.

Restrictions

 The film must be concerned with Hitler's rise, the Spanish Civil War, the Sino-Japanese War, or World War II itself.
 Feature-length live-action films are excluded.
 For documentaries, see: List of World War II documentary films.

Films made before the war

1930s

Year undetermined

Films made during the war

1939

1940

1941

1942

1943

1944

1945

Films made after the war

1940s

1950s

1960s

1970s

1980s

1990s

2000s

2010s

See also
 Bugs & Daffy: The Wartime Cartoons
List of Private Snafu shorts featuring Private Snafu character

Other cartoons of feature length
Victory Through Air Power (1943)
Castle in the Sky (1986)Graveyard of the Fireflies (1988)Rocks in My Pockets (2004) - partially set during World War II but also includes scenes set both before and after the warValiant (2005)

Earlier war cartoonsThe Sinking of the Lusitania (1918)China in Flames (1925) – Soviet cartoon about the Chinese Civil WarDinky Doodle in the Army (192?) with Dinky DoodleGreat Guns! (1927) with Oswald the Lucky RabbitI'm in the Army Now'' (1936) with Popeye and Bluto

Other films of World War II
List of World War II films – fictional features and miniseries
List of World War II TV series – fictional TV series
List of Allied propaganda films of World War II
List of Holocaust films – fictional and documentary
List of German films 1933–1945
List of films based on war books – includes World War II section

References
Unless otherwise stated, the source for film information is the IMDb.

External links
wwii-movies.com List of World War II Movies
Nimbus libéré at YouTube

 

Lists of World War II films
World War II